John Henry (born 31 December 1971) is a Scottish former footballer. During his career, Henry played for Clydebank, Kilmarnock, Falkirk, Airdrie, St Johnstone, Queen of the South and Dumbarton. After retiring as a player, Henry joined the coaching staff of Partick Thistle, Burnley and Blackburn Rovers.

From 2010 he was the reserve team coach at Bolton Wanderers, but left the club shortly after the dismissal of Owen Coyle in October 2012. He subsequently followed Coyle to Wigan Athletic in 2013, undertaking a similar role to that of his Burnley and Bolton days. In January 2015 Henry was appointed assistant manager, working with Ian McCall, at Scottish League One club Ayr United.

In August 2016 Henry left his role with Ayr to once against work alongside Owen Coyle, this time at Blackburn Rovers as first team coach.

References

External links

1971 births
Living people
Footballers from West Dunbartonshire
Scottish footballers
Association football midfielders
Clydebank F.C. (1965) players
Kilmarnock F.C. players
Falkirk F.C. players
Airdrieonians F.C. (1878) players
St Johnstone F.C. players
Queen of the South F.C. players
Dumbarton F.C. players
Scottish Football League players
Scottish Premier League players
Partick Thistle F.C. non-playing staff
Bolton Wanderers F.C. non-playing staff
Wigan Athletic F.C. non-playing staff
Blackburn Rovers F.C. non-playing staff
Scotland under-21 international footballers